The following is a list of the 152 communes of the Lozère department of France.

The communes cooperate in the following intercommunalities (as of 2020):

 

 (partly)
 (partly)

References

Lozere